Hiawatha Glacier is a glacier in northwest Greenland, with its terminus in Inglefield Land. It was mapped in 1922 by Lauge Koch, who noted that the glacier tongue extended into Lake Alida (near Foulk Fjord). Hiawatha Glacier attracted attention in 2018 because of the discovery of a crater beneath the surface of the ice sheet in the area. A publication noted in 1952 that Hiawatha Glacier had been retreating since 1920.


Possible impact structure

In November 2018, a study revealed the existence of a large circular depression beneath Greenland's ice sheet in the Hiawatha Glacier region—up to a kilometre below the surface of the ice. The bedrock within the region of this structure consists of 1.985 to 1.740 billion year old Paleoproterozoic felsic igneous rocks and paragneiss.

Such an impact would have continued to melt ice flowing into the crater for an as-of-yet undetermined period post-impact. If an impact origin for the crater is confirmed, it would be one of the twenty-five largest known impact craters on Earth.

A 2022 study using argon–argon dating combined with uranium–lead dating of shocked zircon crystals in impact melt rocks found in outwash less than 10 km downstream of the glacier yielded an age of 57.99 ± 0.54 million years ago, during the late Paleocene. This put an end to speculation by advocates of the controversial Younger Dryas impact hypothesis. that it was formed by an impact as recently as ~12,800 years ago.

See also
 List of possible impact structures on Earth
 Bølling-Allerød warming
 Operation IceBridge

References

External links

International Team, NASA Make Unexpected Discovery Under Greenland Ice NASA/Video
Massive crater under Greenland's ice points to climate-altering impact in the time of humans Video
Discovering a massive meteorite crater Docu/Video

Impact craters of Greenland
Glaciers of Greenland